Almonacid de Zorita is a municipality located in the province of Guadalajara, Castile-La Mancha, Spain. According to the 2013 census (INE), the municipality has a population of 776 inhabitants.

References

Municipalities in the Province of Guadalajara